Rhabdalestes is a genus of African tetras.  It currently contains eight species.

Species 
 Rhabdalestes aeratis Stiassny & S. A. Schaefer, 2005
 Rhabdalestes brevidorsalis (Pellegrin, 1921)
 Rhabdalestes leleupi Poll, 1967
 Rhabdalestes maunensis (Fowler, 1935) (Okavango robber)
 Rhabdalestes rhodesiensis (Ricardo-Bertram, 1943) (Slender robber)
 Rhabdalestes septentrionalis (Boulenger, 1911)
 Rhabdalestes tangensis (Lönnberg, 1907) (Pangani robber)
 Rhabdalestes yokai Ibala Zamba & Vreven, 2008

 
Fish of Africa
Taxonomy articles created by Polbot